"At Christmas" is a song by Australian recording artist Kylie Minogue, from the 2016 Snow Queen Edition of her thirteenth studio album, Kylie Christmas (2015). The song was released on 22 November 2016 by Parlophone. It serves as the lead single from the reissue, and premiered on The Chris Evans Breakfast Show on BBC Radio 2. The song became BBC Radio 2's Record of the Week.

Live performances
On 6 December, Minogue performed the song on Stasera Casa Mika and two days after on her Facebook page with the Warner Music Choir. On 10 December, was aired a performance of "At Christmas" on The Jonathan Ross Show.

Release history

References

2016 songs
2016 singles
Kylie Minogue songs
Parlophone singles
Songs written by Peter Wallevik
Songs written by Daniel Davidsen
British Christmas songs